Thamud District is a district of the Hadhramaut Governorate, Yemen. As of 2003, the district had a population of 4,402 inhabitants.

Climate

References

Districts of Hadhramaut Governorate